Firefox Environment Backup Extension (or FEBE) is a Pale Moon browser extension for backing up and restoring user profiles.
It was compatible with Firefox version 1.5 - 57-pre. However, Firefox profiles may be backed up manually. The source files are distributed under MPL-2.0.

Among other settings, it handles bookmarks, history, extensions and passwords. The extension offers several configuration options to customize the backup tasks, and can also do scheduled backups.

References

External links
FEBE homepage

Free Firefox legacy extensions
Pale Moon extensions